Chirocephalus croaticus is a species of fairy shrimp in the family Chirocephalidae. It is found only in Croatia and Slovenia and is listed as a vulnerable species on the IUCN Red List.

References

Anostraca
Freshwater crustaceans of Europe
Crustaceans described in 1899
Taxonomy articles created by Polbot